Anders Jahan Retzius (3 October 1742 – 6 October 1821) was a Swedish chemist, botanist and entomologist.

Biography
Born in Kristianstad, he matriculated at Lund University in 1758, where he graduated as a filosofie magister in 1766. He also trained as an apothecary apprentice. He received the position of docent of chemistry at Lund in 1766, and of natural history in 1767. He became extraordinary professor of natural history in 1777, and thereafter held various chairs of natural history, economy and chemistry until his retirement in 1812. He died in Stockholm on 6 October 1821.

He described many new species of insects and did fundamental work on their classification.

Retzius was elected a member of the Royal Swedish Academy of Sciences in 1782.

He was the father of Anders Retzius and grandfather of Gustaf Retzius. Disciples of Anders Jahan Retzius include the botanist Carl Adolph Agardh, the zoologist and archaeologist Sven Nilsson, the botanist and entomologist Carl Fredrik Fallén, and the entomologist Johan Wilhelm Zetterstedt. He was also an influence on the botanist Elias Fries who arrived in Lund by the time Retzius was already an old man.

Selected works
Primae Lineae pharmaciae : in usum praelectionum Suecico idiomate . Dieterich, Gottingae 1771 Digital edition by the University and State Library Düsseldorf
Inledning till djur-riket : efter herr archiatern och riddaren Carl von Linnés lärogrunder (1772)
Observationes botanicae (1778–91)
Floræ Scandinaviæ prodromus; enumerans: plantas Sveciae, Lapponiae, Finlandiae, Pomeraniae, Daniae, Norvegiae, Holsatiae, Islandiae & Groenlandiae (Holmiæ 1779; 2nd edition (1795)
(edited and revised:) Charles De Geer, Genera et species insectorum, e generosissimi auctoris scriptis extraxit, digessit, quoad portem reddidit, et terminologiam insectorum Linneanam addidit (1783)
Lectiones publicæ de vermibus intestinalibus (1784)
Försök til mineral-rikets upställning. (1795)
(edited and revised:) Carl Linnaeus, Faunae Svecicae a C à Linné inchoatae pars prima sistens mammalia, aves, amphibia et pisces Sueciae quam recognovit, emendavit et auxit (1800).
Försök til en Flora Oeconomica Sveciae, eller swenska wäxters nytta och skada i hushållningen (1806–07)

References 

Gunnar Eriksson, "Retzius, Anders Jahan", Svenskt biografiskt lexikon, vol. 30 (1998-2000).

18th-century Swedish botanists
Swedish taxonomists
18th-century Swedish zoologists
1742 births
1821 deaths
18th-century Swedish chemists
Swedish entomologists
Swedish mineralogists
Swedish mycologists
Members of the Royal Swedish Academy of Sciences
People connected to Lund University
Lund University alumni
19th-century Swedish  botanists
19th-century Swedish  chemists
19th-century Swedish  zoologists
19th-century Swedish scientists
People from Kristianstad Municipality